The UK Centre for Materials Education (UKCME) is one of 24 subject centres within the Higher Education Academy (HEA). It  supports teaching and learning in Materials Science and related disciplines. The Centre was established in 2000 as part of the Learning and Teaching Support Network (LTSN), later subsumed within the HEA.  It has been directed from its inception by Professor Peter Goodhew.

The Centre is based at the University of Liverpool and works with individual academics, departments, professional bodies, employers and students to develop and share excellent practice that will enhance the learning experience.

The Centre funds and supports programmes to develop and evaluate innovative approaches to teaching Materials Science.  The Centre also maintains an extensive database of resources relevant to materials education. Lecturers can find material to use in their teaching, whilst students will find items to help support their learning. The database also includes resources on the processes of learning and teaching for those wishing to further develop their approach.

References

External links 
UKCME Website at: http://www.materials.ac.uk/
 The Engineering Subject Centre
 The Centre for Bioscience
 The Physical Sciences Centre

Materials science organizations
Science and technology in Merseyside
Science education in the United Kingdom
University of Liverpool